Pa Bong is a tambon (subdistrict) of Saraphi district, in Chiang Mai province, Thailand. In 2005 it had a population of 3,506 people. The tambon contains six villages.

References

External Links
Google Maps

Tambon of Chiang Mai province
Populated places in Chiang Mai province